Yahaluvo (Friends) (යහළුවෝ), also known as Yahaluwo, is a 2007 Sinhala romantic drama film. It was directed by Sumitra Peries, produced by Namal Senasinghe, the brother of Sujeewa Senasinghe, and scored by Navaratne Gamage. The film stars Sujeewa Senasinghe and Pooja Umashankar in lead roles along with Iranganie Serasinghe, Tony Ranasinghe, Kamal Addararachchi, and Anarkali Akarsha in supportive roles. It is the 1097th Sri Lankan film in the Sinhala cinema.

It was released in December 2007, and was a commercial failure despite positive reviews. The film represented Sri Lanka at the 39th International Film Festival of India in Goa in 2008.

Cast
Sujeewa Senasinghe as Asoka
Pooja Umashankar as Manorani
Himasal Thathsara Liyanage
Iranganie Serasinghe - as Grandmother
Tony Ranasinghe as Sinhala tuition master
Kamal Addararachchi as Gate Keeper
Anarkali Akarsha
Raja Ganeshan as Gardener
Gangu Roshana as Housekeeper
Thesara Jayawardane as Meera
Vasanthi Chathurani as Burgher music teacher
Rathna Sumanapala

Soundtrack

References

2007 films
2000s Sinhala-language films